Spinal adjustment and chiropractic adjustment are terms used by chiropractors to describe their approaches to spinal manipulation, as well as some osteopaths, who use the term adjustment.  Despite anecdotal success, there is no scientific evidence that spinal adjustment is effective against disease.

Spinal adjustments were among many chiropractic techniques invented in the 19th century by Daniel David Palmer, the founder of Chiropractic. Claims made for the benefits of spinal adjustments range from temporary, palliative (pain relieving) effects to long term wellness and preventive care.

Description
The intention of a chiropractic adjustment is to affect or correct the alignment, motion and/or function of a vertebral joint. Specifically, adjustments are intended to correct "vertebral subluxations", a non-scientific term given to the signs and symptoms that are said by chiropractors to result from abnormal alignment of vertebrae. In 2005, the chiropractic "subluxation" was defined by the World Health Organization as "a lesion or dysfunction in a joint or motion segment in which alignment, movement integrity and/or physiological function are altered, although contact between joint surfaces remains intact. It is essentially a functional entity, which may influence biomechanical and neural integrity." This differs from the medical definition of subluxation as a significant structural displacement, which can be seen with static imaging techniques such as X-rays.

This intention forms the legal and philosophical foundation of the profession, and US Medicare law formulates it in this manner:

 "Coverage of chiropractic services is specifically limited to manual manipulation of the spine to correct a subluxation... Medicare will not pay for treatment unless it is 'manual manipulation of the spine to correct a subluxation'."

Chiropractic authors and researchers Meeker and Haldeman write that the core clinical method that all chiropractors agree upon is spinal manipulation, although chiropractors much prefer to use the term spinal "adjustment", a term which reflects "their belief in the therapeutic and health-enhancing effect of correcting spinal joint abnormalities."

The International Chiropractor's Association (ICA) states that the "chiropractic spinal adjustment is unique and singular to the chiropractic profession", and that it "is characterized by a specific thrust applied to the vertebra utilizing parts of the vertebra and contiguous structures as levers to directionally correct articular malposition. Adjustment shall be differentiated from spinal manipulation in that the adjustment can only be applied to a vertebral malposition with the express intent to improve or correct the subluxation, whereas any joint, subluxated or not, may be manipulated to mobilize the joint or to put the joint through its range of motion. Chiropractic is a specialized field in the healing arts, and by prior rights, the spinal adjustment is distinct and singular to the chiropractic profession." One author claims that this concept is now repudiated by mainstream chiropractic. The definition of this procedure describes the use of a load (force) to specific body tissues with therapeutic intent. This "load" is traditionally supplied by hand, and can vary in its velocity, amplitude, duration, frequency, and body location (p. 218) and is usually abbreviated HVLA (high velocity low amplitude) thrust.

Adjustment methods
As the chiropractic profession grew, individual practitioners and institutions proposed and developed various proprietary techniques and methods. While many of these techniques did not endure, hundreds of different approaches remain in chiropractic practice today. Not all of them involve HVLA thrust manipulation. Most cite case studies, anecdotal evidence, and patient testimonials as evidence for effectiveness. These techniques include:

Toggle Drop – this is when the chiropractor, using crossed hands, presses down firmly on a particular area of the spine. Then, with a quick and precise thrust, the chiropractor adjusts the spine. This is done to improve mobility in the vertebral joints.
Lumbar Roll (aka side posture) – the chiropractor positions the patient on his or her side, then applies a quick and precise manipulative thrust to the misaligned vertebra, returning it to its proper position.
Release Work – the chiropractor applies gentle pressure using his or her fingertips to separate the vertebrae.
Table adjustments – The patient lies on a special table with sections that drop down. The chiropractor applies a quick thrust at the same time the section drops. The dropping of the table allows for a lighter adjustment without the twisting positions that can accompany other techniques.
Instrument adjustments – often the gentlest methods of adjusting the spine. The patient lies on the table face down while the chiropractor uses a spring-loaded activator instrument to perform the adjustment. This technique is often used to perform adjustments on animals as well.
Manipulation under anesthesia (MUA) – this is performed by a chiropractor certified in this technique in a hospital outpatient setting when the patient is unresponsive to traditional adjustments.

Techniques
There are many techniques which chiropractors can specialize in and employ in spinal adjustments. Some of the most notable techniques include:

 Activator Methods – uses the Activator Adjusting Instrument instead of by-hand adjustments to give consistent mechanical low-force, high-speed impulses to the body. Utilizes a leg-length analysis to determine segmental aberration.
 Active Release Techniques – soft tissue system/movement based technique that treats problems with muscles, tendons, ligaments, fascia and nerves.
 Bio-Geometric Integration – a framework for understanding the body's response to force dynamics. Can be utilized with many techniques. Focuses on the body's full integration of forces and on assessment for choosing the most appropriate adjustive force application, ranging from light pressure to traditional joint cavitation, for each particular case presentation.
 Blair Upper Cervical Technique – an objective upper cervical technique focusing primarily on misalignments in the first bone of the spine (Atlas) as it comes into contact with the head (Occiput).
 Chiropractic Biophysics (CBP) – a technique which aims to correct improper curvatures of the spine with traditional chiropractic manipulation (SMT), focused rehabilitation exercises, and a unique form of spinal traction which utilizes mechanically assisted and focused stretching to stretch and remodel the ligaments and related tissues of the spine.
 Cox Flexion-Distraction – a decompression focused procedure which utilizes specialized adjusting tables with movable parts; these tables stretch and decompress the facets and ligaments of the spine in a gentle rocking motion.
 Directional Non-Force Technique – utilizes a diagnostic system for subluxation analysis consisting of gentle challenging and a unique leg check allowing the body to indicate the directions of misalignment of structures that are producing nerve interference. A gentle but directionally specific thumb impulse provides a long lasting correction to bony and soft tissue structures.
 Diversified – the classic chiropractic technique, developed by D.D. Palmer, DC. Uses specific manual thrusts focused on restoring normal biomechanical function. Has been developed to adjust extremity joints as well.
 Gonstead Technique – Developed by an automotive engineer turned chiropractor, this technique uses a very specific method of analysis by the use of nervoscopes, full spine x-rays and precise adjusting techniques that condemns "torquing" of the spine, which may harm the Intervertebral disc.
 Hole-in-one Technique/Toggle Recoil Technique – Synonyms for the upper cervical technique developed by B.J. Palmer which utilizes a quick thrust and release, and later incorporated a drop table as seen in modern practice.
 Kale Technique (Specific Chiropractic) – gentle technique which utilizes a special adjusting table that helps adjust and stabilize the upper cervical region surrounding the brain stem.
 Logan Basic Technique – a light touch technique that works to "level the foundation" or sacrum. Its concept employs the use of heel lifts and specific contacts.
 NUCCA Technique – manual method of adjusting the atlas subluxation complex based on 3D x-ray studies which determine the correct line of drive or vector of force.
 Orthospinology Procedure – is a method of analyzing and correcting the chiropractic upper cervical subluxation complex based on vertebral alignment measurements on neck x-rays taken from three different directions. The adjustment can be delivered by hand, hand-held or table mounted instruments along a pre-calculated vector using approximately 1 to 7 pounds of force. The patient is in a side-lying posture with a solid mastoid support. The procedure is based on the work of the late John F. Grostic, D.C.
 Thompson Terminal Point Technique (Thompson Drop-Table Technique) – uses a precision adjusting table with a weighing mechanism which adds only enough tension to hold the patient in the "up" position before the thrust is given.

Over the years, many variations of these techniques have been delivered, most as proprietary techniques developed by individual practitioners. WebMD has made a partial list:

 Activator technique
 Advanced BioStructural Correction
 Applied Kinesiology
 Atlas Orthogonal
 Auricular
 Barge Analysis
 Bio Magnetic
 Bio-Energetic Synchronization
 Bio-Geometric Integration
 Biomechanics

 Blair
 Body Restoration Technique
 Carver Technique
 Cervical Care
 Cervical Drop
 Chiropractic Biophysics (CBP)
 Clinical Kinesiology
 Concept Therapy
 Contact Reflex Analysis
 Cox

 Craniosacral Therapy
 Directional Non-Force
 Diversified technique
 Flexion-Distraction
 Gonstead
 Grostic
 Hole in one [HIO]
 Kale
 Leander
 Logan Basic

 Manual Adjusting
 Meric
 Motion Palpation
 Network
 Neural Organization Technique
 NeuroEmotional Technique (NET)
 Neuro Muscular Technique
 Neuro Vascular Technique
 Nimmo
 Nutrition Response Testing
 Palmer Package

 Pettibon
 Pierce
 Pierce Stillwagon
 Pro-Adjuster
 Receptor Tonus
 Sacral Occipital Technique (SOT)
 Soft Tissue Orthopedics
 Spinal Biomechanics
 Spinal Biomedical Engineering
 Spinal Biophysics

 Thompson
 Thompson Terminal Point
 Toftness
 Toggle Recoil
 Torque Release
 Total Body Modification
 Traction
 Upper Cervical
 Vector Point Therapy
 Versendaal

Effects

Musculoskeletal disorders

The effects of spinal adjustment vary depending on the method performed. All techniques claim effects similar to other manual therapies, ranging from decreased muscle tension to reduced stress.  Studies show that most patients go to chiropractors for musculoskeletal problems: 60% with low back pain, and the rest with head, neck and extremity symptoms. (p. 219) Also the article "Chiropractic: A Profession at the Crossroads of Mainstream and Alternative Medicine" states that, “chiropractic was to be a revolutionary system of healing based on the premise that neurologic dysfunction caused by ‘impinged’ nerves at the spinal level was the cause of most dis-ease”. (p. 218)  The mechanisms that are claimed to alter nervous system function and affect overall health are seen as speculative in nature, however, clinical trials have been conducted that include “placebo-controlled comparisons [and] comparisons with other treatments”. (p. 220) The American Chiropractic Association promotes chiropractic care of infants and children  under the theory that “poor posture and physical injury, including birth trauma, may be common primary causes of illness in children and can have a direct and significant impact not only on spinal mechanics, but on other bodily functions”.

The effects of spinal manipulation have been shown to include: temporary relief of musculoskeletal pain, increased range of joint motion, changes in facet joint kinematics, increased pain tolerance and increased muscle strength. (p. 222) Common side effects of spinal manipulative therapy (SMT) are characterized as mild to moderate and may include: local discomfort, headache, tiredness, or radiating discomfort. (p. 222).

Non-musculoskeletal disorders

Historically, the profession has falsely always claimed that spinal adjustments have physiological effects on inner organs and their function, and thus affect overall health, not just musculoskeletal disorders, a view that originated with Palmer's original thesis that all diseases were caused by subluxations of the spine and other joints. With time, fewer chiropractors hold this view, with "a small proportion of chiropractors, osteopaths, and other manual medicine providers use[ing] spinal manipulative therapy (SMT) to manage non-musculoskeletal disorders. However, the efficacy and effectiveness of these interventions to prevent or treat non-musculoskeletal disorders remain controversial."

A 2019 global summit of "50 researchers from 8 countries and 28 observers from 18 chiropractic organizations" conducted a systematic review of the literature, and 44 of the 50 "found no evidence of an effect of SMT for the management of non-musculoskeletal disorders including infantile colic, childhood asthma, hypertension, primary dysmenorrhea, and migraine. This finding challenges the validity of the theory that treating spinal dysfunctions with SMT has a physiological effect on organs and their function."

Safety

There is has been limited research on the safety of chiropractic spinal manipulation, making it difficult to establish precise estimates of the frequency and severity of adverse events. Adverse events are increasingly reported in randomized clinical trials of spinal manipulation but remain under–reported despite recommendations in the 2010 CONSORT guidelines. Chiropractic spinal manipulation is frequently associated with mild to moderate temporary adverse effects, and also serious outcomes which can result in permanent disability or death, which include strokes, spinal disc herniation, vertebral and rib fractures and cauda equina syndrome. A scoping review found that benign (mild-moderate) adverse events such as musculoskeletal pain, stiffness, and headache were common and transient (i.e., resolved within 24 hours), and affected 23–83% of adults. Serious outcomes are thought to be very rare, yet remain less studied than mild-moderate adverse events. One retrospective study examining 960,140 sessions of chiropractic spinal manipulation found two severe adverse events, both being rib fractures in older women with osteoporosis (incidence of 0.21 per 100,000 sessions). There are several contraindications to chiropractic spinal manipulation, including poor bone integrity, cervical arterial pathology, spinal metastasis, and spinal instability.

See also

 Chiropractic history
 Cracking joints
 Joint manipulation
 Osteopathic manipulation

References

External links

Manual therapy
Chiropractic treatment techniques

ja:アジャストメント